Jamsillaru Station is a station on the Seoul Subway Line 2. Its former name literally means "in the fortress," probably referring to the nearby Mongchon and Pungnap earthen walls, and it was also named from Seongnae-cheon. It is also the closest subway station to the Asan Medical Center.

The station was renamed from "Seongnae" in order to avoid confusion with the Songnae station.

It is located in Sincheon-dong, Songpa-gu, Seoul.

Station layout

Vicinity
Exit 1: Jamsil High School, Asan Medical Center, Jamsil Parkrio APT
Exit 2: Miseong APT, Jinju APT
Exit 3: Songpa District Office
Exit 4: Jangmi APT

References

Seoul Metropolitan Subway stations
Metro stations in Songpa District
Railway stations opened in 1980
1980 establishments in South Korea
20th-century architecture in South Korea